Chris Kapilovic (born November 11, 1968) is an American football coach and former player who is currently the offensive line coach and run game coordinator for the Michigan State Spartans football team.

Coaching career

Colorado
On December 20, 2018, Kapilovic was hired as offensive line coach and run game coordinator for Colorado.

Michigan State
On February 17, 2020, Kapilovic was hired as offensive line coach and run game coordinator for Michigan State.

References

External links
 Michigan State profile

1968 births
Living people
American football offensive tackles
Alabama State Hornets football coaches
Colorado Buffaloes football coaches
Michigan State Spartans football coaches
Missouri State Bears football coaches
Missouri State Bears football players
North Carolina Tar Heels football coaches
Scottsdale Fighting Artichokes football players
Southern Miss Golden Eagles football coaches
Sportspeople from Cleveland
Sportspeople from Phoenix, Arizona
Coaches of American football from Arizona
Players of American football from Phoenix, Arizona
Players of American football from Cleveland